Sefid Dasht (also Romanized as Sefīd Dasht, Safīd Dasht, and Sapīd Dasht) is a village in Shurab Rural District, Veysian District, Dowreh County, Lorestan Province, Iran. At the 2006 census, its population was 40, in 10 families.

References 

Towns and villages in Dowreh County